Carlos Alberto Riccelli is a Brazilian film and television actor.

Selected filmography
 A Moreninha (1970)
 O Princípio do Prazer (1979)
 Leila Diniz (1987)
 The Long Haul (1988)
 The Best Revenge (1996)
 Federal (2010)

References

External links
 

1946 births
Living people
Brazilian male film actors